East Forest is an American ambient/electronic/contemporary classical/indie pop artist from Portland, Oregon, United States. The project was created by Trevor Oswalt who derived "East Forest" from the German translation of his last name (technically Ostwald: Ost=East, Wald=Forest). To date he has released eight full-length albums and six EPs. He has toured extensively throughout North America, as well as performances in Europe. He also performed at festivals such as SXSW, CMJ, Lightning in a Bottle, Arise, and Mysteryland. Music entertainment and pop culture website Altoriot.com referred to East Forest as the "sleeper-hit and best hidden gem" at the 2014 SXSW festival. "His emotive music experimentation of instruments is in a league of its own...".

History

The Education of the Individual Soul (2009)
The Education of the Individual Soul was released on February 3, 2009. Rachel Kowal of NPR described the album as "tied to both nature and to everyday urban life, giving it the qualities of a sort of ethereal and mystical modern-day fairytale."

Leela (2011)
Aside from performing and recording his own material, East Forest also wrote music for Leela, Deepak Chopra’s video game for Xbox 360 Kinect and Wii. This was released on November 11, 2011.

Orbits (2014)
Orbits was released on November 11, 2014 and was very well received.  Under the Gun had this to say: "A revelatory excursion in sound, Orbits serves as the auditory equivalent of a sonic journey through the endless beauties and intricacies Mother Nature has to offer."

Music to Die To and Music to Be Born To, Elements, and Ritual Mystical (2015-2016)
On February 26, 2016, East Forest released 2 EPs: Music to Die To and Music to Be Born To. Tarynn Law of The 405 says the following: "To describe Trevor Oswalt, or East Forest, as innovative is putting it lightly. He aims to capture the essence of the outside world in his music by using different field recordings to do so. He's slept in the Sahara desert, been chased by bears, hung out in the Amazon for a bit and climbed some of the world's tallest mountains alongside his trusty recorder while he does so to capture the sounds of those different landscapes. The sound ends up being reminiscent of Sigur Ros, Olafur Arnalds, or Explosions in the Sky, and it's absolutely stunning."

On June 22, he released a full-length album entitled Elements. This music originated as the soundtrack for Tony's G's series with Udaya.com. It was filmed and performed live in Sofia Bulgaria in the summer of 2015.

2016 also saw the collaboration between East Forest and MC Yogi on MC Yogi's album Ritual Mystical.

Cairn (2017)
On September 8, 2017, East Forest released Cairn, a collaboration with Portland-based producer Keith Sweaty, named for the a stacks of stone built as a landmark to guide you in the wilderness. "I was thinking a lot about how sometimes you don't know where you're going in life...and you're looking for those signs, metaphorically speaking."  Charleston Grit called the album, "relaxing electro-pop music...soothing yet upbeat."

The release of Cairn coincided with a 30-city US tour, opening for musician Trevor Hall (September to November 2017) along with the release of a Cairn (Live) a video recording of East Forest's performance at Jannus Live in St. Petersburg, Florida. The music video was filmed and produced by Sugar Shack Sessions and premiered on Popdose.com

Music For Mushrooms: A Soundtrack For The Psychedelic Practitioner (2019)
On May 10, 2019, East Forest released Music For Mushrooms: A Soundtrack For The Psychedelic Practitioner,  a five hour, fully connected journey designed to musically guide a group or individual through an entire psilocybin experience, start to finish. East Forest made headlines by charting #1 iTunes New Age and finding inclusion in the psychedelic-assisted therapy and research movement.

Ram Dass (2019)
On August 9, 2019, East Forest released his collaborative album with spiritual teacher, psychologist, and author Ram Dass. The collaboration featured newly recorded (and what would end up being the final) teachings from Ram Dass.

“Music is a language that all souls understand. I’m honored that my teachings have been paired with a musician like East Forest, who has crafted an album with so much love.” - Ram Dass

Reworks (2019)
On December 27, 2019, East Forest released Reworks, a collection of compositions from the Ram Dass record reinterpreted by Hammock (band), Nick Mulvey, The Album Leaf, Slow Meadow, Laraaji, Christopher Willits, and Peter Broderick. Reworks was released the same week of Ram Dass's death.

IN: A Soundtrack for the Psychedelic Practitioner Vol II (2021) 
In October, 2021, East Forest released IN: A Soundtrack for the Psychedelic Practitioner Vol II, a two-hour ambient project as a follow-up to Music For Mushrooms: A Soundtrack For The Psychedelic Practitioner.

Members
 Trevor Oswalt (2008–present)

Discography

Studio albums
 The Education Of The Individual Soul (2008)
 Music Meditations (2010)
 Love Bomb (2012)
 Orbits (2014)
 Elements (2016)
 Ritual Mystical (2016)
 Held (2016)
 Cairn (2017)
 Music For Mushrooms: A Soundtrack For The Psychedelic Practitioner (2019)
 Ram Dass (2019)
 Reworks (2019)
 Still (2020)
 Spores (2020)
 Possible (2021)

EPs
 Port Landers (2011)
 Crystal Starship (2011)
 Prana (2013)
 Music To Die To (2016)
 Music To Be Born To (2016)
 Held / Kindred (2017)

References

Musical groups established in 2008
Musical groups from Portland, Oregon
2008 establishments in Oregon